Nabimusaite is a very rare mineral with formula KCa12(SiO4)4(SO4)2O2F.  Its structure, as in case of similar aradite and zadovite, is a derivative of the one of hatrurite. Nabimusaite gives its name to the nabimusaite group. The mineral was found in a pyrometamorphic rock of the Hatrurim Formation, a site known for the natural pyrometamorphism. It is interpreted to have formed due to interaction of a precursor assemblage with sulfate-rich melt. Nabimusaite is potassium- and fluorine-analogue of dargaite.

Associations
Nabimusaite was discovered in nodules composed of larnite and ye'elimite, in a rock formed due to pyrometamorphism.

Notes on chemistry
Nabimusaite is impure as it has a phosphorus admixture.

Crystal structure
Crystal structure of nabimusaite is modular. It is of antiperovskite type. It is composed of hatrurite-like modules [Ca12(SiO4)4O2F]3+ anions in octahedral and cations in tetrahedral coordination with [K(SO4)2]3 modules. The two modules are mutually intercalated.

Origin
Nabimusaite is suggested to result from interaction of a melt, rich in potassium and sulfate, with earlier minerals (ellestadite and larnite).

References

Silicate minerals
Nesosilicates
Sulfate minerals
Calcium minerals
Potassium minerals
Trigonal minerals
Minerals in space group 166